Percy A. Mackrill (born 19 October 1894 – 1949) was a Cape Colony-born footballer and football club manager.

Career
Mackrill joined Bradford Park Avenue in the summer of 1913 and remained with them until the outbreak of war, though failed to make the first team. He spent the war years playing for Rotherham County.

He joined Coventry City in the summer of 1919 as Coventry began their first season in the Football League. However, he played just once before moving to Halifax Town later that year. Halifax were elected to the football league in 1921 and Mackrill played in their first ever league game, a 2–0 defeat away to eventual runners-up Darlington on 27 August 1921.

He played 57 league games for Halifax before leaving at the end of the 1922–23 season to join Pontypridd, where he spent two years before joining Torquay United in 1925. He later became player-manager and led Torquay to the Southern League title in 1927, which they won by 0.002 of a goal from Bristol City reserves. This earned them promotion to the Football League, Torquay winning election in place of Aberdare Athletic.

He left himself out of the starting line-up at the beginning of Torquay's first league season, preferring to play George Smith at left-back. However, after six games, Mackrill returned to the team, playing in the next six games before retiring as a player to concentrate on management, although the team was actually selected by the directors. Torquay finished in last place at the end of their first season in the Division Three (South) and he left in March 1929 with United struggling near the foot of the table once more.

References

1894 births
South African soccer players
Bradford (Park Avenue) A.F.C. players
Rotherham County F.C. players
Coventry City F.C. players
Halifax Town A.F.C. players
Torquay United F.C. players
Pontypridd F.C. players
English Football League players
South African soccer managers
Torquay United F.C. managers
1949 deaths
Association football fullbacks
Cape Colony emigrants to the United Kingdom